Serrated Edge is the second album by Tempest. It was their first with a fiddler, and was released in 1992.

Tracks
Hal-an Tow (Traditional) 
Raggle Taggle Gypsy (Traditional) 
A Kiss in the Morning Early (Traditional) 
Reels on Fire (Traditional) (Heather Bell/Monaghan Twig/Wind That Shakes the Barley)  
The House Carpenter (Traditional) 
Whiskey in the Jar (Traditional) 
Dark Lover (Love Song to a Vampire) (Mercedes Lackey/Sorbye) 
Tam Lin (Traditional) 
Mad Tom of Bedlam (Traditional) 
The Ballydesmond Set (Traditional) (Ballydesmond/Born to Run (Sorbye)/Bill Sullivan’s)

Credits
Lief Sorbye - mandolin, vocals
 Rob Wullenjohn - guitar
 Adolfo Lazo - drums
Ian Butler - bass
Michael Mullen - fiddle
Album produced by Tempest with Mike Demmers,
 Executive Producer: Teri Lee. Recorded at Desitrek Studios, Portland, OR, May 1992. *Engineered by Mike Demmers. Mastered by George Horn at Fantasy Records, Berkeley, CA.

First released by Beacon Records.

References 

1992 albums
Tempest (band) albums